Robert Middlemiss (January 8, 1935 – May 28, 2010) was an engineer and politician from Quebec, who served in the Robert Bourassa and Daniel Johnson Jr. governments.

Biography
Middlemiss was born in Aylmer, Quebec to William Middlemiss, a civil servant, and Imelda Cardinal. He studied at the University of Ottawa and McGill University, obtaining a Bachelor of Applied Science from the latter institution in 1961. He worked as a geotechnical engineer from 1961 to 1981.

Political career
From 1970 until 1979, Middlemiss was an elected alderman for Aylmer. In 1981, his friend Michel Gratton convinced him to be a Liberal candidate in Pontiac, a newly reformed riding that now included the territory of Aylmer.

Being born of an anglophone father and a French-speaking mother, he had the advantage of being equally at ease in both communities. On his first attempt, in 1981, he was elected easily; however, the Liberal Party under leader Claude Ryan formed the opposition. Middlemiss was re-elected four times and never faced a serious challenge in the heavily federalist riding, only once dipping below 50% in 1989 due to the English-speaking minority rights Equality Party challenging the Liberal Government over the invocation of the notwithstanding clause of the Canadian Charter of Rights and Freedoms  to override a Supreme Court of Canada ruling overturning parts of the Charter of the French Language.

In 1985, the Liberals regained power with Robert Bourassa at the head of the party. However, Middlemiss did not enter the Cabinet until 1989. He was named Minister for Agriculture, Fisheries and Food. On October 5, 1990, he became Minister of Transport, and on January 11, 1994, when Bourassa was replaced by the short-lived government of Daniel Johnson Jr., he was appointed Minister of Public Safety.

Final years

Middlemiss did not run for re-election in 2003. He died in Gatineau, Quebec from cancer on May 28, 2010.

References

External links
Robert Middlemiss National Assembly of Québec Biography

1935 births
2010 deaths
Deaths from cancer in Quebec
Geotechnical engineers
McGill University Faculty of Science alumni
Members of the Executive Council of Quebec
Quebec Liberal Party MNAs
Quebec municipal councillors
Politicians from Gatineau
20th-century Canadian politicians
21st-century Canadian politicians